Knutsford railway station serves the town of Knutsford in Cheshire, England. The line is referred to as the Chester via Altrincham line at Manchester Piccadilly, but as the Manchester via Stockport line at Chester station.

History

Knutsford station opened to passengers on 12 May 1862 with a service between Knutsford and Altrincham. Trains to Northwich commenced from 1 January 1863.  Services were operated by CLC until nationalisation on 1 January 1948. The station - as built by Cheshire Lines Railway - more correctly "Cheshire Lines Committee" (CLC) - was built on the site of the farm mentioned in Elizabeth Gaskell's novel Cranford where the cow fell into a lime-pit. The Goods Yard was originally on the south-east side of the track, above the huge brick retaining wall, which ever after became a home for large posters. Later it was re-sited to the north and the original site became the Station Master's garden. There used to be a competition for the best station garden: Knutsford often won this.

In April 1916 there was an Easter Rising in Ireland, where rebels hoped to form an independent Ireland free from British rule. At least 600 rebels involved in that rising were transported to Knutsford by train from Holyhead and imprisoned in Knutsford Gaol.

Facilities
The station has a ticket office and two car parks but no taxi rank. A ticket vending machine is in place for purchase of tickets or promise to pay coupons when the ticket office is closed and for the collection of pre-paid tickets. Both platforms are step-free. Buses call at Adams Hill, adjacent to the car park next to the Chester bound platform. However, half of this car park is private office parking, and is not available to rail users. Station facilities were improved in March 2009 with the addition of a cold drinks and snacks vending machine in the station ticket office. On the Chester bound platform is a Bike & Go bike hire facility, similar in nature to London's Santander Cycles. In 2015, live passenger information screens were installed on both platforms.

Station security
Knutsford station has had a relatively large amount of crime in previous years. In November 2008, CCTV cameras were installed at the station.

Services
Monday to Saturday, there is an hourly service to Manchester Piccadilly, Chester, Stockport, Altrincham and Northwich, with extra trains to/from Stockport at peak times on weekdays. There is a 2-hourly service on Sundays to Chester, Manchester Piccadilly and Southport.

In December 2008 services were revised with the additional morning Chester to Manchester peak services terminating at Stockport, and the additional Manchester to Chester evening peak services starting instead at Stockport, which has prompted an online petition. The revision was necessary to allow the operation of additional services between Manchester and London Euston over the already congested Stockport railway viaduct.  The 15:49 Chester to Manchester service was lost altogether, as was the Saturday 07:30 Chester to Manchester service.  However, the Sunday service was significantly improved, increasing to a 2-hourly service that runs from Chester to Southport via Manchester Piccadilly, rather than a 3-hourly service between Chester and Altrincham.

The average journey time to and from Manchester in the current timetable is between 38 and 49 minutes. This is due to Northern Rail timetabling trains to take longer than expected, to meet punctuality targets. Times to and from Chester take between 41 and 46 minutes, for the same reason.

Passengers numbers at Knutsford are currently increasing by as much as 27% per annum. Knutsford is also the most used station between Mouldsworth and Navigation Road (not including Metrolink figures at Altrincham and Navigation Road.) Also, more passengers board and alight Mid Cheshire line services at Knutsford station than at Stockport station or Chester station.  Knutsford has poorer bus services than other nearby towns which, contributes to more rail use.

Future
As part of Northern's proposed December 2022 timetable (which focuses on additional services within the Manchester area), an additional 4 trains per day between Chester and Stockport (2 in each direction) have been proposed during peak hours on Mondays to Saturdays. These services are aimed at those who are commuting to and/or working in Manchester and Stockport. This change will increase the number of trains departing Chester on the line to 20 per day, with the number departing Stockport also increased to 20 per day. The 2 hourly Sunday service will remain the same, at 7 trains per day.

A campaign was set up by the Knutsford Guardian in 2007 for a later train from Manchester Piccadilly to Knutsford on Friday and Saturday evenings than the current last train which leaves Manchester Piccadilly at 23:17. The 00.32 Saturday Morning Only Manchester Piccadilly to Chester train currently runs non-stop through Knutsford (and all other stations on the Mid Cheshire line), thus a stop at Knutsford (and Northwich) could be facilitated relatively easily.

Re-opening the line between Northwich and Sandbach has been proposed. This will allow direct trains to Crewe from Knutsford, giving a better connection to the Midlands and the South of England.

Proposals for a direct link to Manchester Airport from Knutsford were first put forward in the 1990s, not much had seemed to materialise from this. However, in 2009 Network Rail stated that the creation of the third platform has meant that the capacity at Manchester airport will become constrained by the layover of the trains and congestion at the throat.  To solve this issue they have recommended building a line underneath the Airport towards Northwich in the 2019 to 2024 period.

The running of tram-trains directly into Manchester (via Sale) has been looked into.  In 2013 TfGM said that running tram-trains to Knutsford would provide poor value for money and that alternative heavy rail options should be looked at instead.

References

Further reading

External links

 Mid-Cheshire Community Rail Partnership

Railway stations in Cheshire
DfT Category D stations
Former Cheshire Lines Committee stations
Railway stations in Great Britain opened in 1862
Northern franchise railway stations
Knutsford